Zone was a Buenos Aires, Argentina-based forum for international poetry and prose.

History and profile
In December 2006, Zone presented La Nueva Poesía Ruskaya (The New Russian Poetry) at Crack-Up bookstore, in Palermo Soho, Buenos Aires, featuring translations from Russian to English by Russian-American poet Peter Dimitry Golub, and English to Spanish by Zone contributors Mariana Calandra, Roger McDonough and Andrew Haley. La Nueva Poesía Ruskaya introduced the poetry of Viktor Ivaniv, Julia Idlis, Danila Davydov and other members of "Russia’s Debut Poets" to South America.

Zone maintained an online magazine featuring avant-garde and world poetry and prose until 2012. Past contributors include Richard Cronshey, Sergio Balari Ravera, Pino Blasone, Martins Iyoboyi, Ayn Frances dela Cruz, Rodrigo Verdugo Pizarro, MK Ajay and Prakash Kona.

References

Jeannette Neumann: Internet Babel: Zone (Buenos Aires Herald, 7 April 2007)

External links
 Zone Website

Defunct magazines published in Argentina
Literary magazines published in Argentina
Argentine poetry
Magazines with year of establishment missing
Magazines disestablished in 2012
Magazines published in Buenos Aires
Poetry literary magazines
Spanish-language magazines
Defunct literary magazines